Bullnose is a term used in building construction for rounded convex trim, particularly in masonry and ceramic tile.

Uses 
Bullnose trim is used to provide a smooth, rounded edge for countertops, staircasesteps, building corners, verandahs, or other construction. Masonry units such as bricks, concrete masonry units or structural glazed facing tiles may be ordered from manufacturers with square or bullnosed corners.

When referring to bullnose, it is sometimes modified by adding the word quarter or half.  In the illustration, one piece of quarter-bullnose tile is juxtaposed with a plain piece of tile, to create a finished look - note that the top trim strip shows a quarter-bullnose on two of its sides.

However, when referring to counter tops (such as a granite counter top in a kitchen) which extends beyond the edge of the underlying cabinetry, either a quarter-bullnose or half-bullnose edge may be used.  A half-bullnose can be constructed by bonding two sections with quarter-bullnose, effectively creating a 180-degree curve, in order to create a more finished appearance.  This would effectively double the thickness of that portion which extends beyond the cabinetry.

A bullnose is used in highway construction in North America to buffer and protect the end of the crash barrier or Jersey barrier at entrance and exit ramps.

Name 

The term bullnose originates from the rounded nose of a bull.

See also 
 Morris Oxford bullnose

References 

Building materials